Johann Nepomuk Brischar or Johann Nepomucene Brischar (22 August 1819, Horb, Württemberg – 11 April 1897, Bühl) was a Roman Catholic church historian.

Brischar studied theology at the University of Tübingen and was appointed parish priest of Bühl near Rottenburg in 1853, where he died in 1897. His principal work is the continuation of Count Friedrich Leopold zu Stolberg's History of the Religion of Jesus Christ, of which he wrote volumes forty-five to fifty-four, bringing the history up to 1245 CE. His share of the work does not reach the high standard of his great predecessor. He is also the author of a work in two volumes on the controversies between Paolo Sarpi and Pallavicini, and of a monograph on Pope Innocent III. His Catholic Pulpit Orators of Germany in five volumes was published in Schaffhausen in the years 1866-71. He contributed many articles to Herder's Kirchenlexicon.

External links
 "Johann Nepomuk Brischar" in Allgemeine Deutsche Biographie
This article incorporates text from the 1913 Catholic Encyclopedia article "Johann Nepomucene Brischar" by B. Guldner, a publication now in the public domain.

1819 births
1897 deaths
People from Horb am Neckar
19th-century German historians
19th-century German writers
19th-century German male writers
German male non-fiction writers